Isanga is an administrative ward in the Mbeya Urban district of the Mbeya Region of Tanzania. In 2016 the Tanzania National Bureau of Statistics report there were 10,486 people in the ward, from 9,591 in 2012.

Neighborhoods 
The ward has 7 neighborhoods.
 Igoma Ilolo A
 Igoma Ilolo B
 Ilolo
 Isanga Kati
 Mkuju
 Mmita
 Wigamba

References 

Wards of Mbeya Region